Mark Andrew Wolstenholme (born 20 October 1979) is an English cricketer. Wolstenholme is a right-handed batsman who bowls right-arm medium pace. He was born at Northampton, Northamptonshire.

Wolstenholme represented the Northamptonshire Cricket Board in List A cricket. His debut List A match came against Wiltshire in the 1999 NatWest Trophy. From 1999 to 2001, he represented the Board in five List A matches, the last of which came against the Leicestershire Cricket Board in the 1st round of the 2002 Cheltenham & Gloucester Trophy which was played in 2001. In his five List A matches, he scored 20 runs at a batting average of 10.00, with a high score of 18. In the field he took a single catch. With the ball he took 9 wickets at a bowling average of 19.66, with a single five-wicket haul which gave him best figures of 5/41.

He currently plays club cricket for Northampton Saints Cricket Club in the Northamptonshire Cricket League. In 2011, he played Minor counties cricket for Dorset.

His brother, John, played first-class cricket for Northamptonshire and List A cricket for the Northamptonshire Cricket Board.

References

External links
Mark Wolstenholme at ESPNcricinfo
Mark Wolstenholme at CricketArchive

1979 births
Living people
Cricketers from Northampton
English cricketers
Northamptonshire Cricket Board cricketers
Dorset cricketers